Moti Masjid, may refer to:

 Moti Masjid (Agra Fort), a mosque in Agra, India
 Moti Masjid (Bhopal)
 Moti Masjid (Red Fort), a mosque in Delhi, India
 Moti Masjid (Karachi)
 Moti Masjid (Lahore Fort), a mosque in Lahore, Pakistan
 Moti Masjid (Mehrauli), a mosque in Mehrauli, Delhi

Mosque disambiguation pages